Waskemeer is a village in the municipality of Ooststellingwerf in the east of Friesland, the Netherlands.

History 
The village was first mentioned in 1718 Gr. Waske Meer. The etymology is unclear. Waskemeer started as a peat excavation village after the Haulerwijkstervaart was dug in 1756 by the Drachters Company.

Football
Waskemeer has a football team called Fuotbalferiening Waskemar.  Its uniform is black and the shirt has a green horizontal band and white arm band.  The trousers are black with green pin stripe, and green socks with black band.

References

External links

Geography of Ooststellingwerf
Populated places in Friesland